Gran Turismo is the fourth studio album by Swedish band the Cardigans, released internationally on 19 October 1998 and in November 1998 in the United States. It features a darker and more moody type of music, mixed with more electronic sounds.

In an interview in 2009, producer and sound engineer Tore Johansson commented on the dark sound of the record, which sets it apart from the warm, jammy feel of many other recordings made at Tambourine Studios: "It's a very cold and defined recording, no natural reverb or audio curtains: there's not a sound element on that disc which wasn't deliberately put there."

The album and band were nominated for a total of seven awards at the 1999 Grammis—the Swedish equivalent of the Grammy Awards. Gran Turismo sold more than three million copies worldwide.

Background
The album's name is explained by the band in a track on an advanced copy of the album titled "Explain the Title of the Album Gran Turismo": "The title can be interpreted in many ways but I think we only thought of a few ones we liked," Nina says. "We talked about having like Italian or French title and Gran Turismo came up and it sort of felt really good and you know I can think of music sometimes as tourism and traveling. So to me Gran Turismo is sort of the way to describe music sometimes or spending time with music." Peter says, "and I think that also the title suits this very album extremely well because the album is pretty much about trying to find your place in the world. I think sometimes you can always compare living to being a tourist in the world," Nina finishes.

Track listing

Personnel
Peter Svensson – guitar, vocals
Magnus Sveningsson – bass, vocals
Bengt Lagerberg – drums, percussion
Lars-Olof Johansson – keyboards, piano
Nina Persson – lead vocals

Singles
"My Favourite Game" (10 October 1998, #14 UK)
"Erase/Rewind" (28 February 1999, #7 UK)
"Hanging Around" (17 July 1999, #17 UK)
Gran Turismo Overdrive EP (The Cardigans remixed by Nåid) (19 November 1999, released outside the UK)

Charts

Weekly charts

Year-end charts

Certifications

Covers and appearances in other media
Alternative metal band Deftones recorded a version of the song "Do You Believe" as an extra track for their 2010 album Diamond Eyes, as well as their covers compilation.

The album is possibly named after the racing video game series Gran Turismo; for which the song, "My Favourite Game" plays during the opening video of the Arcade disc of the racing game Gran Turismo 2. In the European version, the song was a remix. The song was also used as the song for Formula One's musical highlights at the end of the 1998 season on ITV.

"Erase/Rewind" is featured on the soundtrack of several films, including The Thirteenth Floor, Never Been Kissed and Gattaca. The song was also featured in an episode of British soap opera Hollyoaks, broadcast on 9 September 2003.

References

External links
 Gran Turismo microsite
 The Cardigans' Complete Discography @ Rolling Stone
 IFPI Sweden
 Polyhex UK chart information

1998 albums
The Cardigans albums
Albums produced by Tore Johansson
Stockholm Records albums